Simone D'Andrea (born November 20, 1973) is an Italian voice actor.

Biography
D'Andrea contributes to voicing characters in anime, cartoons, movies, video games and other content. For example, he is well known for providing the voice of James in the Italian-language version of the ongoing anime series Pokémon. He also provided the voice of Itachi Uchiha in the Italian-language versions of Naruto and Naruto: Shippuden.

He works at Merak Film and other dubbing studios in Italy.

Voice work

Anime and animation
Julian in Fire Emblem Anime
 James in Pokémon
 James in Pokémon Chronicles
 James in Pokémon: The First Movie
 James in Pokémon: The Movie 2000
 James in Pokémon 3: The Movie
 James in Pokémon 4Ever
 James in Pokémon Heroes
 James in Pokémon: Jirachi Wish Maker
 James in Pokémon: Destiny Deoxys
 James in Pokémon: Lucario and the Mystery of Mew
 James in Pokémon Ranger and the Temple of the Sea
 James in Pokémon: Giratina and the Sky Warrior
 James in Pokémon: Arceus and the Jewel of Life
 James in Pokémon: Zoroark: Master of Illusions
 James in Pokémon the Movie: Black—Victini and Reshiram and White—Victini and Zekrom
 Katsuya Jonouchi in Yu-Gi-Oh! Duel Monsters
 Katsuya Jonouchi in Yu-Gi-Oh! The Movie: Pyramid of Light
 Aster Phoenix, Harrington Rosewood, and Belowski in Yu-Gi-Oh! GX
 Hunter Pace and Kalin Kessler in Yu-Gi-Oh! 5D's
 Caleb in W.I.T.C.H.
 Trunks (older) in Dragon Ball Z
 Trunks in Dragon Ball GT
 Reef in Stoked
 Hiroto Kazama in Kilari
 Yoh Asakura in Shaman King
 Kaito Dōmoto in Mermaid Melody Pichi Pichi Pitch
 Yoshio in Fancy Lala
 Sulfus in Angel's Friends
 Itachi Uchiha in Naruto
 Itachi Uchiha in Naruto: Shippuden
 Arthur Read in Arthur
 Tyson Granger in Beyblade
 Tyson Granger in Beyblade V-Force
 Tyson Granger in Beyblade G-Revolution
 Kyoya Tategami in Beyblade: Metal Fusion
 Kyoya Tategami in Beyblade: Metal Masters
 Kyoya Tategami in Beyblade: Metal Fury
 Wally West/The Flash in Justice League
 Wally West/The Flash in Justice League Unlimited
 Masquerade in Bakugan Battle Brawlers
 Masquerade (Episode 32) in Bakugan Battle Brawlers: New Vestroia
 Oswald "Otto" Rocket in Rocket Power
 Kevin Thompson in Daria
 Keigo Taitou in Jewelpet
 Jiro in Blue Dragon
 Jiro in Blue Dragon: Tenkai no Shichi Ryū
 Nozomu Kanō/Kanon in Nurse Angel Ririka SOS
 Li'l Pea in VeggieTales
 Fuyuki Hinata in Keroro Gunso
 Toya Kinomoto in Cardcaptor Sakura
 Thatch in Casper's Scare School (TV series)
 Kirikaze in Fūma no Kojirō
 Naoki Shinjyo in Future GPX Cyber Formula
 Heiji Hattori (Second voice) in Detective Conan
 Heiji Hattori in Detective Conan: The Last Wizard of the Century
 Heiji Hattori in Detective Conan: Crossroad in the Ancient Capital
 Terkel in Terkel in Trouble
 Chichiri in Fushigi Yûgi
 Sasuke/Zazo in Mirmo!
 Knight Valentine in Godannar
 Dr. Chaplin in Teenage Mutant Ninja Turtles (2003 TV series)
 Ren Honjo in Nana
 Takefumi Tonami in His and Her Circumstances
 Bamm-Bamm Rubble in The Flintstones (Second dub)
 Jack Ryder in Odd Job Jack
 Sousuke Sagara in Full Metal Panic!
 Sousuke Sagara in Full Metal Panic? Fumoffu
 Sousuke Sagara in Full Metal Panic!: The Second Raid
 Vinnie in Biker Mice from Mars (2006 TV series)
 Kong in Kong: The Animated Series
 Mullin Shetland in Last Exile
 Kamui Shirō in X
 Archie Andrews in Archie's Weird Mysteries
 Rick Jones in The Incredible Hulk (1996 TV series)
 Mark "Charger" McCutchen in NASCAR Racers
 Kazuya Yanagiba in Wedding Peach
 Kōichi Mizuno in Tonde Burin
 Rigaldo in Claymore
 Dalton (Third voice), Kabaji (Second voice), Paulie, Emporio Ivankov, Duval, and Sham in One Piece
 Ratchet in Giant Mecha Soldier of Karakuri Castle
 Saule in Sugar Sugar Rune
 Generic Man in ChalkZone

Live action
 General Hux in Star Wars: Episode VII – The Force Awakens
 General Hux in Star Wars: Episode VIII – The Last Jedi
 General Hux in Star Wars: Episode IX – The Rise of Skywalker
 Brandon Turner in Dr. Dolittle Million Dollar Mutts
 James Clayton in The Recruit
 Ben Murphy in License to Wed
 Jerry Dandrige in Fright Night (2011 film)
 Dylan Dog in Dylan Dog: Dead of Night
 Dusty Mayron in Daddy's Home
 Dusty Mayron in Daddy's Home 2
 Clark Kent/Superman in Superman Returns
 Lyle/The Napster in The Italian Job
 Alex in Frontier(s)
 Martin Luther in Luther (2003 film)
 Arthur Després in Le Plus Beau Jour de ma vie
 Gene Carson in Flightplan
 Guy Malyon in Head in the Clouds
 Jonathan Preest in Franklyn
 Assi in Lebanon (2009 film)
 Joe Willis in Brothers
 Jake Taylor in Cursed
 Peter Hook in Control
 Styles McFee in National Lampoon Presents Dorm Daze
 Martin "Ickarus" Karow in Berlin Calling
 James Trademore in Kamen Rider: Dragon Knight
 Nicolas in Shall We Kiss?
 Christian Thompson in The Devil Wears Prada
 James Reese in From Paris with Love
 Blaine Rawlings in Flyboys
 Isacc in Day of the Dead 2: Contagium
 Buddy Slade in Young Adult
 The Messiah in Kaboom 
 Marc Silverman, Kevin Callis, and Caesar in Lost
 Charlie Kramer in Masters of Science Fiction
 Nick Fallin in The Guardian (TV series)
 Scott in Higher Ground (TV series)
 Jack Porter in Watch Over Me
 Cool Clarky in The Wiggles
 Sasan in So NoTORIous
 Leslie St. Claire in Charmed
 Arnie Swenton in The Cleaner (TV series)
 Devjeet "Dave" Mohumbhai in Flight of the Conchords 
 Jerry Henson in Angela's Eyes
 Bobby Long in Zack and Miri Make a Porno
 Louis Connelly in August Rush
 Henry Barthes in Detachment
 Marc Marronnier in L'amour dure trois ans

Video games
 Ratchet in Ratchet & Clank
 Ratchet in Ratchet & Clank: Going Commando
 Ratchet in Ratchet & Clank: Up Your Arsenal
 Martin Holan in Nibiru: Age of Secrets
 Masquerade in Bakugan Battle Brawlers

References

External links
 

Living people
Male actors from Milan
Italian male voice actors
1973 births